Arefabad (also Romanized as ʿĀrefābād) is a village in Negur Rural District, Dashtiari District, Chabahar County, Sistan and Baluchestan Province, Iran. At the 2006 census, its population was 240, in 51 families.

References 

Populated places in Dashtiari County